Chen Chunxia is a Chinese beach volleyball player. She competed at the 2012 Asian Beach Games in Haiyang, China, and won the silver medal along with Hu Anna.

References

Living people
Chinese women's volleyball players
Year of birth missing (living people)
Place of birth missing (living people)
21st-century Chinese women